Mr. Moto's Gamble is the third film in the Mr. Moto series starring Peter Lorre as the title character. It is best remembered for originating as a movie in the Charlie Chan series and being changed to a Mr. Moto entry at the last minute.

Plot
In San Francisco, policeman Lieutenant Riggs (Harold Huber) takes Mr. Moto, a detective and Lee Chan (Keye Luke), a student, to a prizefight between Bill Steele (Dick Baldwin) and Frank Stanton (Russ Clark), where the winner will take on the champion, Biff Moran (Ward Bond). However, the fight is fixed and gangster Nick Crowder (Douglas Fowley) bets big money that Stanton won't make it to the fifth round. He goes down in the fourth and dies shortly afterward.

Bookie Clipper McCoy (Bernard Nedell) loses a fortune. Moto proves that it was murder and it is revealed that $100,000 was won in bets around the country against Stanton. Moto works with Lt. Riggs to solve the murder as the championship fight looms.

Comedy is provided by Horace Wellington (Maxie Rosenbloom), a kleptomaniac, and Lee Chan. Moto promised to reveal the murderer's identity on the night of the big fight, but the murderer has plans, too, with a concealed gun, to kill Moto.

Cast
 Peter Lorre as Mr. Moto
 Keye Luke as Lee Chan
 Dick Baldwin as Bill Steele
 Lynn Bari as Penny Kendall
 Douglas Fowley as Nick Crowder
 Jayne Regan as Linda Benton
 Harold Huber as Lieutenant Riggs
 Maxie Rosenbloom as Horace Wellington
 John Hamilton as Philip Benton
 George E. Stone as  Jerry Connors
 Bernard Nedell as Clipper McCoy
 Ward Bond as Biff Moran
 Lon Chaney Jr. as Joey
 Paul Fix as Gangster
 Adrian Morris as Policeman
 Pierre Watkin as District Attorney
 Olin Howland as Deputy Sheriff Burt (uncredited) 
 Gladden James as Cashier (uncredited)
 Lester Dorr as Reporter (uncredited)

Production
In June 1937, Fox said the first three movies in the Mr Moto series would be Think Fast, Mr Moto, Thank You Mr Moto and Mr Moto's Gamble. At the same time, the studio announced three Charlie Chan movies starring Warner Oland, Charlie Chan on Broadway, Charlie Chan at College and Charlie Chan in Radio City.

In July, Fox said Rochelle Hudson would be in Mr Moto's Gamble. This became Look Out Mr Moto which became Mr. Moto Takes a Chance.

Charlie Chan at Ringside
Fox were going do make a Charlie Chan film called Charlie Chan at Ringside starring Warner Oland as Chan and Keye Luke as Number One Son. Jayne Regan was cast on the strength of her performance in Thank You, Mr Moto. The cast would also include Lynn Bari and be directed by Norman Tinling.

Filming started in January 1938, but Oland left the film due to illness that month and the production was suspended. In March 1938, Fox announced Oland would return to the role and appear in Charlie Chan on the Clipper Ship. However he  never recovered from his illness and died in August 1938. Sidney Toler took over the role of Charlie Chan in the ongoing film series.

Fox had spent an estimated $100,000 on the film already when shooting had to be called off. Wanting to salvage something of the situation and reluctant to cast a different actor as Charlie Chan, Sol Wurtzel, head of Fox's B movie unit, had the script rewritten as a Mr. Moto movie.

Two Charlie Chan regulars appeared in the film – Keye Luke, who plays Charlie Chan's son Lee, and Harold Huber, who plays Lt Riggs. Lee Chan is Moto's student in his  criminology class at San Francisco University. Moto mentions that he has heard from Charlie Chan in Honolulu. Moto says he and the head of the homicide squad are mere amateurs compared to Charlie Chan.

Filming recommenced in January 1938. Lon Chaney Jr. had a small role. Filming finished late March 1938, the fourth movie shot in the Moto series.

Release
The film was released relatively quickly in April 1938.

The New York Times liked the fight sequences but called it "an otherwise unexciting film".

The next film shot in the series would be Mysterious Mr. Moto.

Home media
This film, along with Mr. Moto in Danger Island, Mr. Moto's Last Warning, Mr. Moto Takes a Vacation and (as a DVD extra) The Return of Mr. Moto, was released on DVD in 2007 by 20th Century Fox as part of The Mr. Moto Collection, Volume Two.

See also
Think Fast, Mr. Moto 
Thank You, Mr. Moto
Mr. Moto Takes a Chance 
Mysterious Mr. Moto
Mr. Moto's Last Warning 
Mr. Moto in Danger Island
Mr. Moto Takes a Vacation
The Return of Mr. Moto

References

External links

 
 
 
 

1938 films
American black-and-white films
1938 crime drama films
American mystery drama films
20th Century Fox films
1930s mystery drama films
American crime drama films
Films directed by James Tinling
1930s English-language films
1930s American films